Lee Adrian Smelt (born 13 March 1958) is an English former footballer and author of a goalkeeping coaching book (Practice Keeping: An elite goalkeeper development plan for under 9 to under 21s). A goalkeeper, he played professionally for Nottingham Forest, Peterborough United, Halifax Town, Cardiff City and Exeter City, making a total of 175 appearances in the Football League between 1980 and 1986.

After Cardiff, Lee then went to non-league Maidstone United and from there played at Welling United, Thanet United and Hythe Town. Lee was player-assistant manager in latter part of his time at Hythe Town and returned to former club Margate as Manager in 1991.

He left football in 1992 to join the police. He was as of 2018, the Academy Goalkeeping Coach (U9-23) at Charlton Athletic. 

His son Jack was a goalkeeper and for a short period in his career followed in his fathers footsteps as a ‘keeper for Margate.

References

Living people
1958 births
People from Edmonton, London
Colchester United F.C. players
Ebbsfleet United F.C. players
Nottingham Forest F.C. players
Peterborough United F.C. players
Halifax Town A.F.C. players
Cardiff City F.C. players
Exeter City F.C. players
Maidstone United F.C. (1897) players
Welling United F.C. players
Margate F.C. players
Hythe Town F.C. players
Margate F.C. managers
Hythe Town F.C. managers
Association football goalkeepers
English footballers
Charlton Athletic F.C. non-playing staff
English football managers